Max, the 2000-Year-Old Mouse is a 1967 Canadian animated television series produced by Steve Krantz, which originally aired in Canada in 1967 and became popular in several parts of the world, most notably the United States, where it was syndicated on both local and PBS stations between 1969 and 1979, and also the United Kingdom, where it was repeated numerous times on the ITV network between its original transmission in 1969 and its last showing to date in 1992.

Overview
The series was an educational show, aimed at children, in which still pictures and limited animations told the stories about important figures and key events in Western history. 104 episodes were made in total, each running at five and a half minutes in length.

The episodes were filmed quickly and cheaply, and the premise of the show was simple. An episode typically begins in a room in a museum, with artifacts on display while the unseen and unnamed narrator (Bernard Cowan) introduces the era and historical person(s) to be featured. Key figures whose biographies were explored in the series included Paul Revere, Buffalo Bill, and Daniel Boone, among many others, with Max dubiously claiming to have helped all of them over the course of his very long life.

A few years later, Krantz reused the general format (and voice cast) for the similar series Professor Kitzel. The show's theme music was also later used by Siskel and Ebert's movie review series for PBS, Sneak Previews.

Max
Max, voiced by Paul Soles, is a pink mouse who lived in the museum, essentially served as comic relief and also helped with the narration, while repeatedly claiming to have been a witness of and/or participant in various historical events. Footage of Max, set in the past or present, typically shows him as comically clumsy with contemporary tools and weapons.

Episodes

Leonardo da Vinci
Buffalo Bill
Marie Curie
Peter the Great
Davey Crockett
David and Goliath
Elizabeth I
Johnny Appleseed
Lewis and Clark
Manfred von Richthofen
Thomas Edison
William the Conqueror

References

External links

1960s Canadian animated television series
1970s Canadian animated television series
1980s Canadian animated television series
1990s Canadian animated television series
1967 Canadian television series debuts
1992 Canadian television series endings
Animated television series about mice and rats
Canadian children's animated education television series
Television series by Grantray-Lawrence Animation